James David O'Connor (born 5 July 1990) is an Australian professional rugby union footballer who currently plays for Queensland Reds in Super Rugby. He made his international debut for Australia in 2008 at the age of eighteen. He has played for the Western Force and Melbourne Rebels in Super Rugby. In 2013 he played for English Premiership side London Irish, and in the 2014–15 season he moved to France to play in the Top 14 competition for Toulon. His regular playing positions are Fly-half, Centre, Fullback and Wing.

Early life 
O'Connor was born in Australia on the Gold Coast. He lived in Auckland for five years as a child, attending Rutherford Primary School, until the age of eleven when he returned to Australia with his family. He became a boarder at Nudgee College in Brisbane's northern suburbs.

In 2006 O'Connor suffered a ruptured spleen, but went on to be part of the Australian Schools representative team that played against England, Samoa and New Zealand in 2007.

O'Connor's parents are from New Zealand, and his maternal grandparents from South Africa. This, along with his Australian birth, meant he was eligible for all three Tri Nations teams. However, his decision to play for the Wallabies, and debut in 2008, meant he became ineligible to play for the All Blacks or Springboks. He also played for the Australian Sevens in 2008.

Professional career 
O'Connor became the youngest ever Super Rugby debutant at the age of 17, and the second youngest Wallaby in Australian rugby history at the age of 18.

2008–2013: Early years

O'Connor joined the Force in 2008, and came off the bench for his first Super 14 cap in a match against the Reds in Week 10 of the 2008 season. He completed the season's final three matches running on at inside centre. Later that year he made his Australian debut, when he came off the bench as replacement fullback against Italy,. He played Italy again in June 2009 scoring three tries to help Australia to a 31–8 win. In 2009, O'Connor was the Western Force 'Rookie of the Year' award and also won the Wallabies 'Rookie of the Year'.

In 2012 O'Connor commenced a two-year contract with the Melbourne Rebels. His teammates included Nic Stirzaker, fullback Kurtley Beale, centre Mitch Inman, and English international Danny Cipriani. He played at fly-half for the Wallabies in three Tests against the Lions and was included in a five-man leadership group for the team. After continued ill-discipline off the field, the Rebels withdrew from contract extension negotiations at the end of the 2013 Super Rugby season and he was released by the franchise.

Following a number of off-field indiscretions on O'Connor's part and a drunken incident at Perth Airport, O'Connor's ARU top-up contract was torn up and was suspended from the remainder of the test season. Following this low, O'Connor was in talks with the Western Force and the Queensland Reds however, nothing eventuated and O'Connor was forced to ply his trade offshore.

2013–2014: First European stint

On 28 October 2013, O'Connor indicated that he was en route to London to play rugby for "a few months". He was signed by London Irish in October 2013 until the end of the 2013–14 season. He made his debut against Northampton Saints on 3 November and set up the only try that day. He claimed his first try for the club against Worcester Warriors on 4 January 2014, in a match ending 22–9 to the Exiles with O'Connor scoring all 22 points.

2015: Super Rugby return and Wallabies comeback attempt
In 2015, he returned to Super Rugby in a bid to make the Wallabies Rugby World Cup 2015 squad by playing for the Queensland Reds. O'Connor produced solid performances and was arguably one of the higher performers for a poor Queensland outfit, being shifted between fullback, flyhalf and wing in his first appearances before locking down the Red 15 jersey in the last rounds of the season.

Although a part of Wallabies coach Michael Cheika's squads for Wallabies logistics camps throughout the course of the year, O'Connor was not included in the first extended 40-man and subsequently did not feature in any of the squads to follow, including the 2015 Rugby World Cup squad. O'Connor was announced to be part of Brisbane City's squad for their NRC title-defending campaign.

On 13 October, the QRU and Queensland Reds announced that O'Connor would be released from his contract effective immediately, meaning he would not play the 2016 Super Rugby season for the Reds and finish his 2-year contract. O'Connor's release also meant the end of a potential appearance for Brisbane City in the domestic NRC had he sufficiently recovered to play.

2015–2019: Second European stint

After allegations of cocaine use and Toulon decided not to renew his contract and thus he left the club at the ending of the season.

In 2017 O'Connor signed with English Premiership club Sale Sharks shortly before the 2017–18 season. After playing  31 games over 2 years, Sale Sharks agreed to a contract release, allowing him to pursue him ambition to play for Australia at the 2019 Rugby World Cup.

2019–present: Return to Australia and Wallabies comeback
In July 2019, O'Connor signed a 2-year deal with the Queensland Reds and Rugby Australia under what was understood to be strict behavioural clauses. He quickly made his way back into the Australian team for Australia's 47–26 win over New Zealand in Perth, and was subsequently selected in Australia's World Cup squad for the 2019 Rugby World Cup.

Style of play
James O'Connor is a very versatile player, being able to play anywhere in the back line as a fly-half, centre, full-back or wing and is usually described as a utility back. When asked about his preferred position in 2009, he said, "I feel more comfortable at 12 as a second ball player. I also like 15. You definitely get a lot of space. I just want to get on the field whether it is 10, 12 or 15." He is also an accurate goal-kicker.

Off-field

Controversies
O'Connor has been involved in a number of off-field controversies, attracting criticism from senior members of the Wallabies. Most recently, in September 2013, he was stood down from the Wallabies following an incident in which he was removed from Perth airport by Australian Federal Police. As a result, O'Connor missed the final two matches of the 2013 Rugby Championship and was released from his Wallabies contract by the Australian Rugby Union. In February 2017 O'Connor was arrested together with former All Blacks player, Ali Williams, in Paris on suspicion of attempting to buy cocaine.

Media
O'Connor was a participant in the second season of reality competition series Australia's Greatest Athlete.

References

External links 
 James O'Connor at Wallabies
 James O'Connor at ItsRugby.co.uk
 James O'Connor at ESPNscrum

Australia international rugby union players
Australian expatriate rugby union players
Australian people of Irish descent
Australian people of New Zealand descent
Australian people of Dutch descent
Australian people of South African descent
Australian rugby union players
Living people
Melbourne Rebels players
Sportspeople from the Gold Coast, Queensland
Rugby union fly-halves
Rugby union fullbacks
Western Force players
London Irish players
RC Toulonnais players
Queensland Reds players
Expatriate rugby union players in England
Expatriate rugby union players in France
Australian expatriate sportspeople in England
Australian expatriate sportspeople in France
1990 births
Male rugby sevens players
Sale Sharks players
Barbarian F.C. players
Rugby union players from Queensland